, known as Yae, is a Japanese singer, mainly known outside Japan for having performed the theme songs for the GameCube role-playing video game Final Fantasy Crystal Chronicles.

Biography
Yae is the second daughter of the singer and musician  and the activist .

She studied modern dance during high school, and decided to become a singer in 1999. She started singing in restaurants and bars, by which time she had formed a band and expanded her musical style. In June 2000, she debuted with the album "new Aeon".

Discography

Albums 
2000 new Aeon
2003 Blue Line
2004 Yae -flowing to the sky-
2004 aloha nui
2006 Yae: Live

Singles and extended plays 
 2000 Kaze No Michi
2003 Na mo naki Kimi he
 2003 Kaze No Ne and Hoshizukiyo (Final Fantasy Crystal Chronicles, opening and ending theme songs)
 2005 Koi no Sanbusaku
 2010 あいをよる おもいをつむぐ

Other appearances 
 2001 Blasa, 

References

External links
Yae's official site
Profile at Square Enix Music Online

1975 births
Living people
Video game musicians
Singers from Tokyo
Anime singers
Anime musicians
21st-century Japanese singers
21st-century Japanese women singers